Church and 22nd Street station is a light rail stop on the Muni Metro J Church line, located in the Noe Valley neighborhood of San Francisco, California. The stop, which opened with the line on August 11, 1917, is located on Church Street just south of a short rail-only right of way that allows the line to avoid a steep hill on Church Street near 21st Street. The stop has no platforms, trains stop at marked poles just south of 22nd Street and passengers cross a parking lane on Church Street to board trains. The stop is not accessible to people with disabilities.

The stop is also served by the  route which provides service along the J Church line during the early morning when trains do not operate.

In March 2014, Muni released details of the proposed implementation of their Transit Effectiveness Project (later rebranded MuniForward), which included a variety of stop changes for the J Church line. A new outbound platform would be built on the private right of way north of 22nd Street, while a transit bulb would be built for the inbound stop.

References

External links 

SFMTA – Church St & 22nd St, Right Of Way/22nd St
SF Bay Transit (unofficial): Church St & 22nd St,  Right Of Way/22nd St

Muni Metro stations
Railway stations in the United States opened in 1917